Aram Gaspari Sargsyan (born August 14, 1949, Yerevan, Armenian SSR, Soviet Union) is an Armenian politician, social-democratic activist and former communist. He was the last leader of the Armenian Soviet Socialist Republic.

From 1967 to 1972 he studied at Yerevan State Linguistic University, then at Moscow Higher Komsomol School. Sargsyan worked in different factories. In the 1970–80s he was a correspondent for Komsomolskaya Pravda and Pravda in Armenia. In 1990 Sargsyan was the secretary of the Central Committee of the Communist Party of Armenia. From May 14, 1991 to September 7, 1991, he was the First Secretary of the Central Committee of the Communist Party of Armenia. After the dissolution of the communist party, he founded the Democratic Party of Armenia, which he has led since 1991. He was a member of Armenian parliament in 2003–2007 as a member of the parliamentary bloc Ardarutyun ("Justice").

External links

 Biography (in Russian)

Politicians from Yerevan
Party leaders of the Soviet Union
Yerevan Brusov State University of Languages and Social Sciences alumni
Living people
1949 births
Communist Party of Armenia (Soviet Union) politicians
Armenian communists
Democratic Party of Armenia politicians